"Sloop John B" (originally published as "The John B. Sails") is a Bahamian folk song from Nassau. A transcription by Richard Le Gallienne was published in 1916, and a version was included in Carl Sandburg's  The American Songbag in 1927. Since the early 1950s there have been many recordings of the song with variant titles including "I Want to Go Home" and "Wreck of the John B".

In 1966, the Beach Boys recorded a folk rock adaptation that was produced and arranged by their de facto leader, Brian Wilson. Released as the second single from their album Pet Sounds, the record peaked at number three in the U.S., number two in the UK, and topped the charts in several other countries. It was innovative for containing an elaborate a cappella vocal section not found in other pop music of the era, and it remains one of the group's biggest hits.

In 2011, the Beach Boys' version of "Sloop John B" was ranked  on Rolling Stones list of "The 500 Greatest Songs of All Time".

Earliest publications

"The John B. Sails" was transcribed by Richard Le Gallienne, with five verses and the chorus published in his article “Coral Islands and Mangrove-Trees” in the December 1916 issue of Harper’s Monthly Magazine (pp. 81–90). The first two verses and chorus were also published in Chapter IV of Gallienne's 1917 novel Pieces of Eight. The lyrics describe a disastrous voyage on a sloop, with the vessel plagued by drunkenness, arrests and a pig eating the narrator's food. In the chorus, the narrator repeatedly expresses a desire to return home. 

Carl Sandburg included the first three verses and chorus of "The John B. Sails" in his 1927 collection of folksongs, The American Songbag. He states that he collected it from John T. McCutcheon (a political cartoonist from Chicago) and his wife, Evelyn Shaw McCutcheon, who at the time owned Blue Lagoon Island, a Cay off of Nassau.  The McCutcheons told him:

The Beach Boys version

Arrangement

The Kingston Trio's 1958 recording of "The John B. Sails" was recorded under the title "The Wreck of the John B." It was the direct influence on the Beach Boys' version. The Beach Boys' Al Jardine was a keen folk music fan, and he suggested to Brian Wilson that the Beach Boys should record the song. As Jardine explains:

Jardine updated the chord progression by having the subdominant (D♭ major) move to its relative minor (B♭ minor) before returning to the tonic (A♭ major), thus altering a portion of the song's progression from IV — I to IV — ii — I. This device is heard immediately after the lyric "into a fight" and "leave me alone".

Wilson elected to change some lyrics: "this is the worst trip since I've been born" to "this is the worst trip I've ever been on", "I feel so break up" to "I feel so broke up", and "broke up the people's trunk" to "broke in the captain's trunk". The first lyric change has been suggested by some to be a subtle nod to the 1960s psychedelia subculture.

Recording 
The instrumental section of the song was recorded on July 12, 1965, at United Western Recorders, Hollywood, California, the session being engineered by Chuck Britz and produced by Brian Wilson. The master take of the instrumental backing took fourteen takes to achieve. Wilson's arrangement blended rock and marching band instrumentation with the use of flutes, glockenspiel, baritone saxophone, bass, guitar, and drums.

The vocal tracks were recorded over two sessions. The first was recorded on December 22, 1965, at Western Recorders, produced by Wilson. The second, on December 29, added a new lead vocal and Billy Strange's 12-string electric guitar part. Jardine explained that Wilson "lined us up one at a time to try out for the lead vocal. I had naturally assumed I would sing the lead, since I had brought in the arrangement. It was like interviewing for a job. Pretty funny. He didn't like any of us. My vocal had a much more mellow approach because I was bringing it from the folk idiom. For the radio, we needed a more rock approach. Wilson and Mike [Love] ended up singing it." On the final recording, Brian Wilson sang the first and third verses and Mike Love sang the second.

Kent Hartman, in his book The Wrecking Crew, described Billy Strange's contribution to the song. Brian Wilson called Strange into the studio one Sunday, played him the rough recording, and told him he needed an electric twelve-string guitar solo in the middle of the track. When Strange replied that he did not own a twelve string, Wilson responded by calling Glenn Wallichs, the head of Capitol Records and owner of Wallichs Music City. A Fender Electric XII and Twin Reverb amplifier were quickly delivered (despite the shop they were ordered from being closed on Sundays), and Strange recorded the guitar part in one take. Wilson then gave Strange $2,000 to cover the cost of the equipment.

Single release
A music video set to "Sloop John B" was filmed for the UK's Top of the Pops, directed by newly employed band publicist Derek Taylor. It was filmed at Brian's Laurel Way home with Dennis Wilson acting as cameraman.

The single, backed with the B-side "You're So Good to Me", was released on March 21, 1966. It charted highly throughout the world, remaining as one of the Beach Boys' most popular and memorable hits. It placed  in the UK, Ireland (where it was the group's highest charting single), Canada, and in Record World. It was the fastest Beach Boys seller to date, moving more than half a million copies in less than two weeks after release. It had a three-week stay at number 1 in the Netherlands, making it the "Hit of the Year".

Cash Box described the single as a "topflight adaptation" that treats "the folk oldie in a rhythmic, effectively-building warm-hearted rousing style."

Other releases
In 1968, the recording's instrumental was released on Stack-O-Tracks. Along with sessions highlights, the box set The Pet Sounds Sessions includes two alternate takes, one with Carl Wilson singing lead on the first verse, and one with Brian singing all parts.

In 2011, the song was sung by Fisherman's Friends at Cambridge Folk Festival. and released on Suck'em and Sea. It was featured in the compilation album Cambridge Folk Festival 2011 
In 2016, to commemorate the fiftieth anniversary of Pet Sounds, Brian Wilson and his touring band (including Al Jardine) performed Sloop John B live at Capitol Studios.

In 2021, another UK based group, Isle 'Ave A Shanty sang the song at the 2021 Harwich Sea Shanty Festival and included the song on their 2022 debut album Swinging the Lamp.

Personnel

Per band archivist Craig Slowinski.

The Beach Boys
Bruce Johnston — backing vocals
Mike Love – lead and backing vocals
Al Jardine – backing vocals
Brian Wilson – lead and backing vocals
Carl Wilson – backing vocals
Dennis Wilson – backing vocals

Additional musicians and production staff

 Hal Blaine – drums
 Chuck Britz – engineer
 Frank Capp – glockenspiel
 Al Casey – acoustic rhythm guitar
 Jerry Cole – 12-string lead guitar
 Steve Douglas – temple blocks
 Carol Kaye – electric bass
 Al De Lory – tack piano
 Jay Migliori – flute
 Jim Horn – flute
 Jack Nimitz – bass saxophone
 Lyle Ritz – string bass
 Billy Strange – 12-string lead guitar, overdubbed 12-string lead guitars
 Tony (surname unknown) – tambourine

In popular culture

 In many Jewish communities, the Shabbat table song "D'ror Yikra" is sometimes sung to the tune of "Sloop John B" because of its similar meter.

Television and film
1966 – Dr. Miguelito Loveless, in the TV series The Wild Wild West sang a version of this in a duet with Antoinette in the episode titled "The Night of the Raven" (original air date 30 September 1966).
1967 – Bill Mumy as Will Robinson and Marta Kristen as Judy Robinson, sang a version of this song in the "Castles in Space" episode of the TV series Lost in Space (original air date 20 December 1967).
 – The phrase and melody of "I Want To Go Home" appeared on a drunk driving Public Service Announcement on Los Angeles area television stations in a humorous ad depicting golf balls with the intoxicated driver as the ball rolling erratically and singing the phrase, being pursued by a plain white ball with a single black stripe accompanied by a siren sound effect.
1994 – Featured in the film Forrest Gump, when Forrest first arrives in Vietnam.
1999 – Featured in the closing scene of Season 1, Episode 18 of Aaron Sorkin's Sports Night (ABC Television)
2000 – In the film Glory Glory, the piano player in the bar is playing "Sloop John B" as the main characters are flirting with the posse.
2003 – In the film Calendar Girls, the Beach Boys instrumental track is used as the press swoops down on the little village of Knapely after the calendar comes out.
2007 – In the film Full of It, the main character Sam and his family sing the song while driving Sam to school.
2009 – A choral arrangement was performed in episode 3 of the BBC Drama All the Small Things. It was arranged by Colin Hanson-Orr and Chris O'Hara.
2013 – The film The Wolf of Wall Street prominently features the cover of "Sloop John B" by Me First and the Gimme Gimmes.
2023 - In the Season 3 Trailer for Netflix's series Outer Banks

English football
It has been popular amongst English football fans since the mid-2000s when Liverpool adapted the song to sing about their 2005 Champions League final triumph in Istanbul. It was subsequently adopted by the supporters of English non-league team F.C. United of Manchester as a club anthem in 2007.

Since then more high-profile teams have followed suit, usually with different lyrics for their own teams, including Watford, with Newcastle, Blackpool, Middlesbrough and Hull also adopting the song as their own. It was sung by Phil Brown, the manager of Hull City FC, shortly after Hull had avoided relegation from the Premier League in 2009.

Scottish football
The melody of "Sloop John B" has been used as the basis for the "Famine Song", a sectarian anti-Irish Catholic song which refers to Irish migration to Great Britain in the context of the Great Irish Famine and contains the line "the famine's over, why don't you go home?". The song has been sung by fans of Rangers F.C. in reference to rival club Celtic F.C., which was established by Irish Catholic migrants in Glasgow and retains a large Irish supporter base. The song was first sung publicly by Rangers fans at a match at Celtic Park in April 2008. Rangers have repeatedly asked their fans not to sing the song. In 2009 Scotland's Justiciary Appeal Court ruled that the song was racist, with judge Lord Carloway stating that its lyrics "are racist in calling upon people native to Scotland to leave the country because of their racial origins".

List of recordings

All versions titled "Sloop John B", except where noted.

Chart history

Weekly singles charts

Year-end charts

References

External links

 

1966 singles
1966 songs
Folk rock songs
The Beach Boys songs
Song recordings produced by Brian Wilson
Capitol Records singles
Number-one singles in Austria
Number-one singles in Germany
Number-one singles in Norway
Number-one singles in New Zealand
Number-one singles in Sweden
Number-one singles in Switzerland
Number-one singles in South Africa
Chamber pop songs
Song recordings with Wall of Sound arrangements
Tom Fogerty songs
Roger Whittaker songs
Jerry Jeff Walker songs
Dick Dale songs
The Ventures songs
Relient K songs
Barry McGuire songs
Gary Lewis & the Playboys songs
Jerry Butler songs
Simple Minds songs
Football songs and chants
The Kingston Trio songs
The Brothers Four songs
Songs about boats
Sea shanties
Year of song unknown
Songwriter unknown
RPM Top Singles number-one singles
Bahamian songs
Folk songs